Vladimir Andreyevich Uspensky (Russian: Влади́мир Андре́евич Успе́нский; 27 November 1930 – 27 June 2018) was a Russian mathematician, linguist, writer, doctor of physics and mathematics (1964). He was the author of numerous papers on mathematical logic and linguistics. In addition, he also penned a number of memoir essays. Uspensky initiated a reform of linguistic education in Russia.

Biography 

Uspensky graduated in 1952 from the MSU Faculty of Mechanics and Mathematics (Lomonosov Moscow State University). He was a student of Andrey Kolmogorov. He was the head of the Chair of Mathematical Logic and Theory of Algorithms in the MSU Faculty of Mechanics and Mathematics (1995) and one of the founders of the Structural Linguistics branch (now the Theoretical and Applied Linguistics branch) in the MSU Faculty of Philology, where he also taught.
He was the author of many books and of over 100 research papers. He prepared 25 candidates and 4 doctors of sciences. His book "The Apology of Mathematics" received in 2010 the “Enlightener" award in the field of natural and exact sciences. He was a distinguished professor at the Moscow State University (1998).
His brother Boris Uspensky is a distinguished Russian philologist and mythographer.

References
V.A. Uspensky. Труды по нематематике. М.: ОГИ, 2002, т. I—II.  (т.1),  (т.2)
 Chapter from the book "Апология математики"
 V.A. Uspensky: Seven reflections on the themes of philosophy of mathematics
 V.A. Uspensky: Lecture on mathematics as part of the culture, and the Poincare conjecture

External links
 Mathematics Genealogy Project entry
 MSU home page
 Dynkin Collection entry with video interviews
 Russian listing of publications
 Math-Net.ru list of publications, including video lectures

1930 births
2018 deaths
Linguists from Russia
Russian mathematicians
Russian non-fiction writers
Writers from Moscow
Moscow State University alumni
Academic staff of Moscow State University
Soviet mathematicians